Constantino Segundo Mohor Sanhueza (17 September 1934 – 30 December 2018) was a Chilean football player and manager.

Club career

Early years
Born in Los Sauces, Chile, Mohor represented the team of the normal school of Victoria commune at the age of 16 and the team of the same city a year later, playing also for the teams of another communes such as Mulchén, Los Ángeles and Traiguén. Then, he represented the team of University of Concepción in regional tournaments where competed teams of industries such as Fanaloza.

In Chile
He joined Palestino after a trial in 1954 with the Serbian Miodrag (or Milan) Stefanović as coach, winning in 1955 both the Primera División and the reserves national championship.

After playing for Palestino, in October 1961 he played for Colo-Colo. In 1962 he switched to Santiago Morning. In his stint with the club, it is remembered a tragic car accident that he and three fellows suffered in January 1963, when they came back to Santiago after a match against Deportes La Serena, dying his fellow Jorge Huasito Fuenzalida.

After a stint in Spain, he played for Unión La Calera (1966) and Deportes Concepción (1967–68), with whom he won the 1967 Segunda División and got promotion to the top division, being well remembered along with his Argentine fellow Óscar Coll.

In Spain
However, he played in the Segunda División for Calvo Sotelo (1964–65) and Hospitalet (1965–66), where he coincided with his compatriot Jaime Ramírez.

As an anecdote, he was registered as born in 1937 since foreign players over 30 year-old couldn't be signed.

International career
In 1958 he represented a Chile national team that played two friendlies against the Austrian club First Vienna. Then, he took part of Chile squad in the 1959 South American Championship in Buenos Aires. He made his official debut in a friendly match against Uruguay on 5 June 1960.

Coaching career
At professional level, he coached Rangers, Ñublense, among others. In 1986, he won the Chilean Tercera División with General Velásquez. In addition, he has been one of the four Chilean managers who have worked in Costa Rica along with Hugo Tassara, Román Soto and Javier Mascaró, being the coach of Guanacasteca.

Outside of coaching professional clubs, he worked for the Ministry of Sports of Chile and also coached youth teams.

Personal life
His family came to Southern Zone of Chile from Palestine at the end of the 19th century and his father put a shop in Los Sauces.

Honours

As player
Palestino (reserves)
 Campeonato Nacional: 1955

Palestino
 Chilean Primera División: 1955

Deportes Concepción
 Chilean Segunda División: 1967

As manager
General Velásquez
 Chilean Tercera División:

References

External links
 
 Constantino Mohor at PartidosdeLaRoja.com 

1934 births
2018 deaths
People from Malleco Province
Chilean people of Palestinian descent
Chilean footballers
Chilean expatriate footballers
Chile international footballers
Club Deportivo Palestino footballers
Colo-Colo footballers
Santiago Morning footballers
CE L'Hospitalet players
Unión La Calera footballers
Deportes Concepción (Chile) footballers
Chilean Primera División players
Segunda División players
Primera B de Chile players
Chilean expatriate sportspeople in Spain
Expatriate footballers in Spain
Association football midfielders
Chilean football managers
Chilean expatriate football managers
Rangers de Talca managers
Ñublense managers
Chilean Primera División managers
Primera B de Chile managers
Chilean expatriate sportspeople in Costa Rica
Expatriate football managers in Costa Rica